Julie Mae Schoenung is an American materials scientist who is a professor at the University of California, Irvine. She is co-director for the University of California Toxic Substances Research and Teaching Program Lead Campus in Green Materials. Her research considers trimodal composites and green engineering. She was elected Fellow of The Minerals, Metals & Materials Society in 2021.

Early life and education 
Schoenung was an undergraduate student in Chicago, where she studied materials science at the University of Illinois Urbana-Champaign. She moved to Massachusetts Institute of Technology for graduate studies, earning a Master's degree in 1985 and a PhD in 1987. Her doctoral research considered an economic assessment of ceramics for automotive engines. After earning her doctorate Schonung moved to California. She joined California State Polytechnic University in 1989.

Research and career 
Schonung moved to the University of California, Davis. She was appointed to the faculty at the University of California, Irvine in 2015. She is interested in nanostructured materials and green engineering processes. To generate nanostructures in functional materials, Schoenung makes use of cryomilling. Cryomilling can improve the oxidation behaviour of thermal barrier coatings as well as generating boron carbide reinforced aluminium nanocomposites. Green engineering processes are safer for the environment; they are less energy demanding, generate less pollution and do not release toxic chemicals. In particular, Schoenung is interested in the problem of electronic-waste and the infrastructure required for e-waste recycling. 

Her research considers the factors that surround decision making in materials selection, with a particular focus on sustainability. She combines life-cycle assessment with management theory and environmental economics. 

In 2008, Schoenung was appointed to the Green Ribbon Science Panel, a group of researchers appointed by Arnold Schwarzenegger to protect Californians from toxic chemicals.

Awards and honors 
 2012 Elected Fellow of the ASM International
 2016 Acta Materialia, Inc Holloman Award for Materials & Society
 2016 Elected Fellow of the Alpha Sigma Mu International Professional Honor Society
 2017 Materials Science & Engineering-A Innovation in Research Award
 2018 ASM International Edward DeMille Campbell Memorial Lectureship
 2018 Elected Fellow of the American Ceramic Society
 2021 The Minerals, Metals & Materials Society Fellow Award

Selected publications

References 

Living people
American materials scientists
Women materials scientists and engineers
University of California, Irvine faculty
Year of birth missing (living people)
Place of birth missing (living people)
University of Illinois Urbana-Champaign alumni
University of California, Davis faculty
Massachusetts Institute of Technology alumni
California State Polytechnic University, Pomona faculty
Fellows of the American Ceramic Society
21st-century American women scientists
21st-century American scientists
Fellows of the Minerals, Metals & Materials Society